Jacqueline Cabaj Awad (born 28 January 1996) is a Swedish tennis player.

She has won nine singles and 13 doubles titles on the ITF Women's Circuit. On 18 September 2017, she achieved her best singles ranking of world No. 458. On 31 October 2022, she peaked at No. 247 in the WTA doubles rankings.

Cabaj Awad made her WTA Tour debut at the 2013 Swedish Open, having received a wildcard with Cornelia Lister into the doubles draw. They lost to Marina Melnikova and Ksenia Palkina in the first round.

Playing for Sweden Billie Jean King Cup team, she has a win-loss record of 5–9.

ITF Circuit finals

Singles: 14 (9 titles, 5 runner-ups)

Doubles: 29 (13 titles, 16 runner-ups)

References

External links
 
 
 
 

1996 births
Living people
People from Eskilstuna
Swedish female tennis players
Swedish people of Lebanese descent
Sportspeople of Lebanese descent
Sportspeople from Södermanland County
20th-century Swedish women
21st-century Swedish women